Dane Hans Ivan Peter Sorensen (born 4 October 1955) is a New Zealand former rugby league footballer who played in the 1970s and 1980s.

Background
He's the brother of fellow Kiwi international, Kurt Sorensen, and the nephew of another pair of Kiwi brothers, Bill and Dave Sorensen. He is of Maori, Tongan and Danish descent.

Playing career
Sorensen began his career playing for the Mt Wellington club in the Auckland Rugby League competition when aged just 17. He first made the New Zealand national rugby league team in 1972 and also represented New Zealand Māori. He joined the Cronulla-Sutherland club in the New South Wales Rugby League premiership in 1977 and, due to a release clause in his contract, later that year became the first New Zealander to be selected for the Kiwis while based overseas. Sorensen played for the Sharks from 1977 until 1989 except for 1984 when he spent the season with Eastern Suburbs. Sorensen played 217 games for the Sharks and has the 4th-highest number of appearances for the club. At the time of his retirement, Sorensen held the club record for most appearances.

Later life
Sorensen later served as the Sharks club director.

References

External links
Dane Sorensen at eraofthebiff.com
Dane Sorensen at yesterdayshero.com.au

1955 births
Living people
New Zealand rugby league players
Mount Wellington Warriors players
New Zealand national rugby league team players
New Zealand Māori rugby league players
New Zealand Māori rugby league team players
Auckland rugby league team players
Cronulla-Sutherland Sharks players
Sydney Roosters players
New Zealand sportspeople of Tongan descent
New Zealand people of Danish descent
New Zealand rugby league administrators
Rugby league players from Auckland
Rugby league props